The women's triple jump event at the 2017 Summer Universiade was held on 25 and 27 August at the Taipei Municipal Stadium.

Medalists

Results

Qualification
Qualification: 13.90 m (Q) or at least 12 best (q) qualified for the final.

Final

References

Triple jump
2017
Universiade